
Stackelberg is a surname, mainly known as the surname of a noble family of Baltic German descent (see Stackelberg family). Notable people with the surname include:

A 
Adolphe Stackelberg (1822–1871), Swedish count and Christian revivalist
Aleksandr Stackelberg (1897–1975), Russian entomologist

B 
 (1662–1734), Swedish Field Marshal
 (1777–1841), Swedish Field Marshal

C 
 (1777–1841), Baltic German, second husband of Josephine Brunsvik

E 
Eduard von Stackelberg (1867–1943), Baltic German in Estonia chemist, landowner and politician
Ernst von Stackelberg (1813–1870), Baltic German serving as a Russian military figure and diplomat

F 
Fritz Stackelberg (1899–1988), Swedish diplomat

G 
Garnett Stackelberg (1910–2005), US journalist and socialite
Georg von Stackelberg (1851–1913), Baltic German serving as a Russian Cavalry General
Gustav Ernst von Stackelberg (1766–1850), Baltic German serving as a Russian ambassador at the Congress of Vienna

H 
Heinrich Freiherr von Stackelberg (1905–1946), Baltic German economist

O 
Otto Magnus von Stackelberg (ambassador) (1736–1800), Baltic German serving as a Russian ambassador
Otto Magnus von Stackelberg (archaeologist) (1786–1837), Baltic German archaeologist from Estonia

S 
Siegfried Nikolai von Stackelberg of Erchless Castle, Scotland

See also
 Stackelberg competition (named after Heinrich Freiherr von Stackelberg), a strategic game in economics in which the leader firm moves first and then the follower firms move sequentially